A Buddha is a 2005 Argentine film written and directed by Diego Rafecas, a Zen teacher in Argentina It features Agustín Markert, Carolina Fal and Diego Rafecas himself in the lead roles.

Plot
Tomas and Rafael are two brothers orphaned as children when their parents were taken by the military during the military dictatorship (1976-1983) in Argentina. Tomas experiments with extreme ascetic spiritual practices affecting his life and environment. Rafael, the elder brother, is a professor of philosophy at the University of Buenos Aires. Detached and alone, he views his brother's doings skeptically, questioning his Buddhist revelations. As they struggle to reconcile their differences, Tomas journeys to a Zen monastery in the mountains of Cordoba to find a Master, followed by his girlfriend. As Rafael lands there their struggles with each other and the world around them take a dramatic turn as they're all brought together.

Reception

"A restless exploration of spirituality in times of personal selfishness… East and West in a worthy emotional trip." –Javier Firpo, La Razon

"A very good film. Above all it explains the experience of having a spiritual awakening." –Carlos Boghossian, Gente

"The movie is genuine Buddhist. I find this film to aim and succeed in creating a very touching story about human searching for meaning in Buddhist tradition." –Caridad Martin, Buddhist Door

Cast
Agustín Markert as Tomás 
Carolina Fal as Laura 
Diego Rafecas as Rafael 
Julieta Cardinali as Sol 
Tina Serrano as Lucy 
Vera Carnevale as Laila 
Nelly Prince as Lela 
Boy Olmi as Papá 
Paula Siero as Mamá 
Luis Ziembrowski as Rata 
Juan Manuel Tenuta as Juan 
Toshiro Yamauchi as Maestro 
Iván De Pineda as Carlos 
Paula Montero as Secretaría 
Fabián Bril as Claudio

Awards

Wins
Málaga Spanish Film Festival | 2005 | Silver Biznaga | Audience Award
Washington DC Independent Film Festival | 2007 | Audience Award | Best Feature & Special Recognition | Cine Latino
Wine Country Film Festival | 2006 |Best First Feature Film

References

External links
 

2005 films
Argentine drama films
2000s Spanish-language films
Films about Buddhism
2000s Argentine films